The Escuminac Formation is a geologic formation in Quebec. It preserves fossils dating back to the Devonian period.

Description

Miguasha National Park is located within this formation along the estuary of the Restigouche River on the south coast of the Gaspé Peninsula. The fossil biota from the Park is thus referred to as the Miguasha biota. The main Miguasha exposures were named the 'René Bureau Cliffs' after the geologist and paleontologist.

The formation's depositional environment has been variously considered as lacustrine, estuarine, coastal marine or marine, though evidence from the fossil assemblage, stratigraphic and sedimentological setting, and geochemistry of the sedimentary rocks and bones suggests an estuarine interpretation is most fitting.

Fossil content

Vertebrates

Acanthodians

Actinopterygians

Jawless fish

Placoderms

Sarcopterygians

Invertebrates

Arthropods

Ctenophores

Plants

See also

 List of fossiliferous stratigraphic units in Quebec

References

 

Devonian Quebec
Devonian southern paleotemperate deposits